Martin Hristov (born 31 January 1997) is a Macedonian footballer who plays for FK Donji Srem in Serbian SuperLiga, and the Macedonia national under-19 football team as a striker.

Club career
He played with FK Makedonija Gjorče Petrov and FK Teteks in the Macedonian First Football League.  During the winter break of the 2014–15 season he moved to Serbian side FK Donji Srem.  He made his debut in the 2014–15 Serbian SuperLiga on 21 February 2015 in the round 16 against Borac Čačak.

International career
Martin Hristov played for the Macedonian U-17 team.

References

1997 births
Living people
Footballers from Skopje
Association football forwards
Macedonian footballers
North Macedonia youth international footballers
FK Makedonija Gjorče Petrov players
FK Teteks players
FK Donji Srem players
FK Gorno Lisiče players
NK Koprivnica players
FK Skopje players
Macedonian First Football League players
Serbian SuperLiga players
First Football League (Croatia) players
Macedonian Second Football League players
Macedonian expatriate footballers
Expatriate footballers in Serbia
Macedonian expatriate sportspeople in Serbia
Expatriate footballers in Croatia
Macedonian expatriate sportspeople in Croatia